Charlotte de Rohan (Charlotte Godefride Élisabeth; 7 October 1737 – 4 March 1760) was a French aristocrat who married into the House of Condé, a cadet branch of the ruling House of Bourbon, during the Ancien Régime. She was Princess of Condé by her marriage. She has no known descendants today as her grandson, heir to the Condé family, died without children and her daughter remained childless. Charlotte was praised for being a cultured and attractive princess of her age.

Early life
Charlotte Godefride Élisabeth de Rohan was born on 7 October 1737 in Paris. Her father was Charles de Rohan, Prince de Soubise, a great friend of King Louis XV of France. Her mother was Anne Marie Louise de La Tour d'Auvergne. Anne Marie Louise was a granddaughter of Marie Anne Mancini, one of the famous Mazarinettes. Through Marie Anne Mancini, Charlotte was a cousin of both Prince Eugene of Savoy and Louis Joseph de Bourbon, two famous generals during the reign of Louis XIV. Anne Marie Louise was also the great-great-granddaughter of Madame de Ventadour, the governess of King Louis XV as a small child.

Charlotte was born at the Hôtel de Soubise in Paris, the townhouse of the Rohan family in the fashionable Marais. She had a younger half sister, Victoire Armande Josèphe de Rohan. Victoire would later become the governess of the future king, Louis de France. Victoire was also a cousin of Queen Marie Antoinette's ill-fated friend, the princesse de Lamballe. As the House of Rohan claimed descent from the Dukes of Brittany, Charlotte and her family were accorded the rank of [[Foreign Prince|princes étrangers]]at the French court with the corresponding style of Highness.

In 1739, she was created Marchioness of Gordes and Countess of Moncha, both of which she received from her mother when she died. In 1745, she was made the Viscountess of Guignen in her own right. In her dowry, she was given the Lordship of Annonay, which she passed onto the Bourbons.

Princess of Condé

Charlotte married Louis Joseph de Bourbon, Prince de Condé in a ceremony at the Palace of Versailles on 3 May 1753. Charlotte's father reportedly gave a dowry of 20 million livres. Louis Joseph had been the prince de Condé since 1740 when at the young age of four he had lost his father, Louis Henri, Prince de Condé. His father, as the duc de Bourbon, had been the chief minister of King Louis XV and had been instrumental in arranging the young King's marriage to the Polish princess Marie Leszczyńska. He was only forty-eight at the time of his death.

Louis Joseph's mother, the German princess, Caroline of Hesse-Rotenburg, died the next year in 1741 at the age of twenty-two. As a result, Louis Joseph was an orphan and had been raised by his uncle the Count of Clermont. The new princesse de Condé was among the most important females at court, ranking behind Queen Marie Leszczyńska and her eight daughters, the Duchess of Orléans and Mademoiselle; Mademoiselle would later become her daughter-in-law.

Louis Joseph possessed the rank of prince du sang'' at court with the corresponding style of Serene Highness, a style Charlotte assumed when she became the princesse de Condé.

Three children were born to the marriage. First a girl was born in 1755, soon to be followed by a desired son in 1756, then another daughter was born in 1758. Charlotte lived at the Hôtel de Condé in Paris, the Condé family residence, since the Palais Bourbon built by Louis Joseph's grandmother Louise-Françoise de Bourbon had been sold to the crown. A cultured princess, she was kind to the poor.

Death
It was at the Hôtel de Condé that Charlotte died after a ‘long illness‘ as reported by the Duke of Luynes. She was just twenty-two years old, the same age her mother-in-law, Caroline, had been at her death. She was buried at the Carmelite Convent of the Faubourg Saint-Jacques. The official time for mourning for Charlotte began on 11 March.

Her husband went on to marry again in 1798. He married his second wife Maria-Caterina di Brignole-Sale, the widow of Honoré III, Prince of Monaco.

Children
Marie de Bourbon, Mademoiselle de Bourbon (16 February 1755 - 22 June 1759); died in childhood.
Louis Henri, Prince of Condé (13 April 1756 - 30 August 1830); married Bathilde d'Orléans and had issue.
Louise Adélaïde de Bourbon (5 October 1757 - 10 March 1824); died unmarried, and had no issue.

Ancestry

References and notes

1737 births
1760 deaths
Nobility from Paris
Charlotte
Charlotte
18th-century French nobility
Charlotte
Charlotte
Burials at the Carmel du faubourg Saint-Jacques
Gordes, Marchioness of, Charlotte de Rohan